Carol Dennis may refer to:

 Carolyn Dennis (born 1954), sometimes known professionally as Carol Dennis, American singer and actress
 Carol L. Dennis (born 1938), author, editor, and teacher